The 2002 Internationaux de Strasbourg was a women's tennis tournament played on outdoor clay courts. It was the 16th edition of the Internationaux de Strasbourg, and was part of the Tier III Series of the 2002 WTA Tour. The tournament took place at the Centre Sportif de Hautepierre in Strasbourg, France, from 20 May until 25 May 2002. Second-seeded Silvia Farina Elia won her second consecutive singles title at the event and earned $27,000 first-prize money.

Finals

Singles

 Silvia Farina Elia defeated  Jelena Dokić 6–4, 3–6, 6–3
 It was Farina Elia's 1st singles title of the year and the 2nd of her career.

Doubles

 Jennifer Hopkins /  Jelena Kostanić defeated  Caroline Dhenin /  Maja Matevžič 0–6, 6–4, 6–4

References

External links
 ITF tournament edition details 
 Tournament draws

Internationaux de Strasbourg
2002
Internationaux de Strasbourg
Internationaux de Strasbourg